Aniq (also Romanized as Anīq and Annīq; also known as Anekh, Aneq, Anigh, Anīkh, Kochev’ye Anekho, and Maḩall-e-Chādor Neshīnī) is a village in Nowjeh Mehr Rural District, Siah Rud District, Jolfa County, East Azerbaijan Province, Iran. At the 2006 census, its population was 170, in 41 families.

References 

Populated places in Jolfa County